"Warrior's Dance" is the twentieth single released by the British electronic band the Prodigy on 11 May 2009, and it is the second commercial single from the album Invaders Must Die after "Omen" and the free "promo" single "Invaders Must Die".

The track's chorus is a sample of "Take Me Away" by Final Cut with True Faith. It also contains beat samples from "Let The Warriors Dance" by Addis Posse.

The digital single was released on 17 April in Australia, exclusively on iTunes, although only the "Edit" version with none of the remixes is also available. When released on iTunes Australia, the song was titled incorrectly and the download was actually a song from Placebo. However, this issue was fixed later on.

The song peaked at number 9 on the UK Singles Chart.

The song was also featured in the soundtrack of the game Colin McRae: DiRT 2.

Remixes
Three remix versions of Warrior's Dance are being sold on the Prodigy's own store, as digital downloads in MP3 format. An extra remix is exclusive to iTunes.

Track list

CD single
"Warrior's Dance" (edit) – 2:55
"Warrior's Dance" (South Central remix) – 5:40

12' vinyl
"Warrior's Dance" (Benga remix) – 4:45
"Warrior's Dance" (South Central remix) – 5:40

Downloads
"Warrior's Dance" (edit) – 2:55
"Warrior's Dance" (Album Version) – 5:13
"Warrior's Dance" (South Central remix) – 5:40
"Warrior's Dance" (Benga remix) – 4:45
"Warrior's Dance" (Kicks Like A Mule remix) – 5:09

iTunes downloads
"Warrior's Dance" (edit) – 2:56
"Warrior's Dance" (album version) – 5:14
"Warrior's Dance" (South Central remix) – 5:41
"Warrior's Dance" (Benga remix) – 4:46
"Warrior's Dance" (Future Funk Squad's 'Rave Soldier' mix) – 5:33
"Warrior's Dance" (Kicks Like A Mule remix) – 5:10

Music video
The music video was posted on the band's Myspace and YouTube page on 3 April 2009, after being postponed from an exclusive broadcast on Channel 4 the week before. It was directed by Corin Hardy.

It features a mix of puppetry and stop-frame animation, featuring three humanoid cigarette packets branded with various Prodigy logos (representing the three members of the band) starting a miniature rave within a pub with other cigarette packages, eventually causing a fire on top of a table. The three Prodigy cigarette boxes then exit the house, leaving the rest of the dancing cigarette packages to continue burning. A man enters the pub to 'open up' the next morning, puzzled to find all the burnt cardboard remains.
Cigarette boxes contain the message "Smoking is harmful to your health" in Ukrainian language ("Куріння шкодить вашому здоров'ю").

The video won an award at the 2009 Rushes Soho Shorts Film Festival for best music video.

Charts

Weekly charts

Year-end charts

Certifications

References

The Prodigy songs
2009 singles
Songs written by Liam Howlett
Electronic rock songs
2009 songs
Stop-motion animated music videos
Cooking Vinyl singles